Polygala nyikensis is a plant species in the family Polygalaceae. It is a perennial herb with short, crisped, pubescent stems  spreading from a wood rootstock. It produces flowers with a pale mauve or magenta colour. The plant is used by the people native to the area to treat fungal skin problems and the root was shown to exert antifungal activity.

References

nykensis